The southern scrub flycatcher (Sublegatus modestus) is a species of bird in the family Tyrannidae. It is found in Argentina, Bolivia, Brazil, Paraguay, Peru, and Uruguay. Its natural habitats are subtropical or tropical dry forest, subtropical or tropical moist lowland forest, and subtropical or tropical dry shrubland.

References

Sublegatus
Birds described in 1831
Taxonomy articles created by Polbot